Aideu (Behind the Screen) is an Assamese film produced by the Nagaon-based organization Trinayan Media Foundation and directed by Arup Manna. It was released at the Mumbai International Film Festival on 8 February 2007 and screened at the Pune International Film Festival, Delhi Habitat Film Fest and the 25th Munich International Film Festival. The film was shot in 16 mm format with a modest budget of Rs 1,600,000.

Plot
The film concerns the tragic life and times of the first actress in Assamese cinema, Aideu Handique. Handique made her debut in the 1935 film Joymoti. She died in 2002.

Cast
 Aideu Handique as herself
 Prasanta Kumara Das as Jyotiprasad Agarwala
 Chandana Sarmah as Aideu Handique
 Nabamika Borthakur as Aideu's mother
 Sopunti Bordoloi as Dimbo Gohain
 Pithuraj Goswami as Keshab, younger brother of Aideu

Awards
Aideu was nominated for and would go on to receive Best Feature Film in Assamese at the 54th National Film Awards in India.

See also
Cinema of Assam
National Film Award for Best Feature Film in Assamese

References

External links
 Recognition too late, Sangeeta Barooah Pisharoty at hindu.com.

2007 films
Films set in Assam
2000s Assamese-language films